Ürümqi County is a county of Xinjiang Uyghur Autonomous Region, Northwest China, it is under the administration of the prefecture-level city of Ürümqi, the capital of Xinjiang. It contains an area of 4,601 km² and according to the 2002 census has a population of 80,000.

According to Xingjian geographic graduate school of Chinese Section College, the geographical midpoint of Asia is located within the county. Urumqi Glacier No.1, the glacier closest to an urban area in the world is also in the county.

References

External links
 http://www.wlmqx.gov.cn/ - Ürümqi County official website

County-level divisions of Xinjiang
Ürümqi